Güneycik is a village in the Nazımiye District, Tunceli Province, Turkey. The village is populated by Kurds of the Karsan tribe and had a population of 43 in 2021.

The hamlet of Yalıntaş is attached to the village.

References 

Villages in Nazımiye District
Kurdish settlements in Tunceli Province